Neal LaMoy Broten (born November 29, 1959) is an American former professional ice hockey player. A member of the 1980 US Olympic hockey team that won the gold medal at Lake Placid in 1980, Broten was inducted into the US Hockey Hall of Fame in 2000 having appeared in 1,099 National Hockey League (NHL) regular season games from 1981 to 1997 with the Minnesota North Stars, Dallas Stars, New Jersey Devils and Los Angeles Kings. He is the older brother of Aaron and Paul Broten.

Early career
Broten, like his two brothers, attended Roseau High School, a perennial hockey contender in the state of Minnesota, where he appeared with the Rams in the state tournament in three consecutive years (1977–79). His 1978 achievement of four assists in a single period still stands as a Roseau Rams' record today.

As a college freshman playing for Herb Brooks and the Minnesota Golden Gophers, Broten scored 21 goals, had 50 assists, and was named WCHA Rookie of the Year His final goal of that season was the game winner that clinched the 1979 NCAA Championship in which the Gophers defeated the University of North Dakota by a score of 4–3. Broten would later win the inaugural Hobey Baker award in 1981, which honors the US collegiate hockey's best player.

Broten is one of two players, along with Ed Belfour, to have played on teams that won the NCAA hockey championship (University of Minnesota in 1979), the Olympic Gold Medal (Team USA, 1980), and the Stanley Cup (New Jersey Devils, 1995). He is the only player to have won the Hobey Baker, the Olympic Gold Medal and the Stanley Cup.

NHL/International career
Broten was a member of the United States Olympic team that won a gold medal at the 1980 Winter Olympics in an event known as the Miracle on Ice. He was also a member of Team USA at the 1981 Canada Cup and 1984 Canada Cup tournaments as well as the 1990 Ice Hockey World Championship.

Broten played 17 seasons in the National Hockey League. Highlights of his long NHL career include the first American to score more than 100 points in a single season (1985–86) as well as two NHL All-Star Game appearances in 1983 and 1986.

He won a Stanley Cup with the New Jersey Devils in 1995, scoring the game-winning goal in Game Four against the Detroit Red Wings to clinch the title. Coincidentally, his 1980 Soviet counterpart Viacheslav Fetisov was on the ice for the heavily favored Red Wings when Broten scored the clincher. Broten became the first American to score a Cup-winning goal. Fellow Americans Brett Hull, Mike Rupp, Patrick Kane, and Alec Martinez have done it since.

Broten served as the captain of the Dallas Stars for two months during the lockout-shortened 1994–95 NHL season after the trade of previous captain Mark Tinordi, serving as captain for a month prior to his trade to New Jersey. He had previously served as an alternate captain on a number of occasions.

During the 1982–83 NHL season, Broten participated in a rare fight against Wayne Gretzky. It was one of only a handful of fights during both his and Gretzky's careers. Broten later recalled how he and his teammates would later have to deal with Gretzky's enforcers, Marty McSorley and Dave Semenko.

Broten initially refused to play for the North Stars in 1991–92 due to a contract dispute, instead playing in Germany for BSC Preussen Berlin where he filled in for his former U.S. Olympic teammate Dave Silk who was on temporary leave in the U.S. with his pregnant wife.

Post career

Broten briefly came out of retirement in 1999 to once again play for the US national team in the 1999 Ice Hockey World Championship qualifying tournament (the U.S. team featuring several NHL players had surprisingly finished among the bottom four in the previous 1998 world championship tournament) when no active NHL players were available. He scored six points in three games as the U.S. won the tournament, before retiring from hockey for good. He lives in River Falls, WI. In 2014, Broten's nephew, Shane Gersich, was drafted by the Washington Capitals.

In popular culture
Broten is not featured in the 1981 TV movie about the 1980 U.S. hockey team called Miracle on Ice except in archival footage of the gold medal ceremony.

In the 2004 Disney movie Miracle, he is portrayed by Trevor Alto. Alto played college hockey for the University of British Columbia Thunderbirds.

In the 2008 documentary, Pond Hockey, he reflects on his youth growing up playing hockey in his hometown of Roseau, MN.

Awards and honors

 NCAA Championship - Minnesota Golden Gophers (1979)
 WCHA Rookie of the Year (1979)
 Gold Medal XIII Olympic Winter Games, Lake Placid (1980)
 Hobey Baker Memorial Award (1981)
 NHL All Star (1983, 1986)
 Stanley Cup champion - New Jersey Devils (1995)
 Lester Patrick Trophy (1998)
 US Hockey Hall of Fame (2000)
 Broten's jersey number (7) was retired by the Dallas Stars (February 7, 1998).
 Voted by Minnesota Wild fans as the greatest hockey player ever from Minnesota (2009).

Transactions
 Drafted: Minnesota North Stars, 2nd Round (42 overall), 1979 NHL Entry Draft. Pick was obtained by the North Stars in a draft-day trade that sent Dave Semenko from the North Stars to the Edmonton Oilers in exchange for 2nd and 3rd round draft picks.
 Traded to the New Jersey Devils for Corey Millen, 2/27/95
 Traded from New Jersey Devils to Los Angeles Kings for future considerations, 11/22/96
 Claimed on waivers by Dallas from Los Angeles, 1/28/97

Career statistics

Regular season and playoffs

International

See also
 List of members of the United States Hockey Hall of Fame
 List of NHL players with 100-point seasons
 List of NHL players with 1,000 games played

References

External links
 
 Profile at hockeydraftcentral.com
 Picture of Neal Broten's Name on the 1995 Stanley Cup Plaque

1959 births
Living people
1980 US Olympic ice hockey team
American men's ice hockey centers
BSC Preussen Berlin players
Dallas Stars players
Hobey Baker Award winners
Ice hockey players from Minnesota
Ice hockey players at the 1980 Winter Olympics
Lester Patrick Trophy recipients
Los Angeles Kings players
Medalists at the 1980 Winter Olympics
Minnesota Golden Gophers men's ice hockey players
Minnesota North Stars draft picks
Minnesota North Stars players
National Hockey League All-Stars
National Hockey League players with retired numbers
New Jersey Devils players
Olympic gold medalists for the United States in ice hockey
People from Roseau, Minnesota
Phoenix Roadrunners (IHL) players
Stanley Cup champions
United States Hockey Hall of Fame inductees
NCAA men's ice hockey national champions
AHCA Division I men's ice hockey All-Americans